In organic chemistry, an acyl halide (also known as an acid halide) is a chemical compound derived from an oxoacid by replacing a hydroxyl group with a halide group (where X is a halogen).

If the acid is a carboxylic acid, the compound contains a  functional group, which consists of a carbonyl group singly bonded to a halogen atom. The general formula for such an acyl halide can be written RCOX, where R may be, for example, an alkyl group, CO is the carbonyl group, and X represents the halide, such as chloride. Acyl chlorides are the most commonly encountered acyl halides, but acetyl iodide is the one produced (transiently) on the largest scale.  Billions of kilograms are generated annually in the production of acetic acid.

Preparation

Aliphatic acyl halides
On an industrial scale, the reaction of acetic anhydride with hydrogen chloride produces a mixture of acetyl chloride and acetic acid:
(CH3CO)2O + HCl -> CH3COCl + CH3CO2H

Common syntheses of acyl chlorides also entail the reaction of carboxylic acids with phosgene, thionyl chloride, and phosphorus trichloride  Phosphorus pentabromide is used for acyl bromides, which are rarely of value.

Aromatic acyl chlorides
Benzoyl chloride is produced from benzotrichloride using either water or benzoic acid:
C6H5CCl3  +  H2O  -> C6H5COCl  +  2 HCl
C6H5CCl3  +  C6H5CO2H -> 2 C6H5COCl  +  HCl
As with other acyl chlorides, it can be generated from the parent acid and other chlorinating agents phosphorus pentachloride or thionyl chloride.

Representative laboratory routes to aromatic acyl halides are comparable to those for aliphatic acyl halides. For example, chloroformylation, a specific type of Friedel-Crafts acylation which uses formaldehyde as a reagent, or by the direct chlorination of benzaldehyde derivatives.

Acyl fluorides
Of commercial interest, acyl chlorides react with HF to give acyl fluorides. Cyanuric fluoride converts carboxylic acids to acyl fluorides.

Acyl bromides and iodides
Acyl bromides and iodides are synthesized accordingly but are less common.

Reactions 
Acyl halides are rather reactive compounds often synthesized to be used as intermediates in the synthesis of other organic compounds. For example, an acyl halide can react with:
water, to form a carboxylic acid.  This hydrolysis is the most heavily exploited reaction for acyl halides as it occurs in the industrial synthesis of acetic acid.

an alcohol to form an ester

an amine to form an amide

an aromatic compound, using a Lewis acid catalyst such as AlCl3, to form an aromatic ketone. See Friedel-Crafts acylation.
carboxylic acids to form an organic acid anhydrides.

In the above reactions, HX (hydrogen halide or hydrohalic acid) is also formed.  For example, if the acyl halide is an acyl chloride, HCl (hydrogen chloride or hydrochloric acid) is also formed.

Multiple functional groups 

A molecule can have more than one acyl halide functional group. For example, "adipoyl dichloride", usually simply called adipoyl chloride, has two acyl chloride functional groups; see the structure at right. It is the dichloride (i.e., double chloride) of the 6-carbon dicarboxylic acid adipic acid. An important use of adipoyl chloride is polymerization with an organic di-amino compound to form a polyamide called nylon or polymerization with certain other organic compounds to form polyesters.

Phosgene (carbonyl dichloride, Cl–CO–Cl) is a very toxic gas that is the dichloride of carbonic acid (HO–CO–OH). Both chloride radicals in phosgene can undergo reactions analogous to the preceding reactions of acyl halides. Phosgene is used a reactant in the production of polycarbonate polymers, among other industrial applications.

General hazards 
Volatile acyl halides are lachrymatory because they can react with water at the surface of the eye producing hydrohalic and organic acids irritating to the eye. Similar problems can result if one inhales acyl halide vapors. In general, acyl halides (even non-volatile compounds such as tosyl chloride) are irritants to the eyes, skin and mucous membranes.

References

External links 

Functional groups